Exoprosopa fascipennis is a species of bee flies in the family Bombyliidae. The larvae are ectoparasites of solitary wasp larvae.

References

External links

 

Bombyliidae
Articles created by Qbugbot
Insects described in 1824